Newport 1958 is a live album by pianist Dave Brubeck and his quartet recorded at the 1958 Newport Jazz Festival in Rhode Island of music by and associated with Duke Ellington. Several of the tracks were later re-recorded in New York City due to sound problems with the live Newport recordings.

Reception

Ken Dryden reviewed the album for Allmusic and wrote that "The inspired choice of "Jump for Joy" makes for some of the most magical moments, while "Perdido" provides an extended workout for Desmond and Brubeck. ...Brubeck's "The Duke," an elegant tribute to Ellington that showcases Desmond's lyrical alto and the exciting finale of "C Jam Blues" (the latter spotlighting Morello are also highlights".

Track listing 
 "Things Ain't What They Used To Be" (Mercer Ellington, Ted Persons) – 6:54
 "Jump for Joy" (Duke Ellington) – 5:15
 "Perdido" (Juan Tizol, Ervin Drake, Hans Lengsfelder) – 12:54
 "Liberian Suite - Dance No.3" (D. Ellington) – 6:24
 "The Duke" (Dave Brubeck) – 6:23
 "Flamingo" (Edmund Anderson, Theodor Grouya) – 6:23
 "C Jam Blues" (D. Ellington) – 4:53

Personnel 
 Dave Brubeck – piano
 Paul Desmond – alto saxophone
 Joe Benjamin – double bass
 Joe Morello – drums
 Irving Townsend – liner notes

References

1958 live albums
Albums recorded at the Newport Jazz Festival
Columbia Records live albums
Dave Brubeck live albums
Duke Ellington tribute albums
Instrumental albums